Abeh-ye Now (also Romanized as Ābeh-ye Now) is a village in Lajran Rural District, in the Central District of Garmsar County, Semnan Province, Iran. At the 2006 census, its population was 65, in 10 families.

References 

Populated places in Garmsar County